Trampoline is the fifth studio album by the American country music band The Mavericks. The album was released on March 10, 1998, by MCA Nashville. It includes the singles "To Be with You", "Dance the Night Away" and "I've Got This Feeling". Although none of these singles were Top 40 hits on the U.S. country charts, "Dance the Night Away" reached number 4 on the UK Singles Chart and "I've Got This Feeling" reached number 27.

Track listing

Personnel
As listed in liner notes.

The Mavericks
Paul Deakin – drums, electric guitar
Nick Kane – electric guitar, acoustic guitar, 12-string guitar, baritone guitar
Raul Malo – lead vocals, background vocals, acoustic guitar, electric guitar, high-strung acoustic guitar, gut string guitar, electric sitar, six-string bass guitar, piano, drums
Robert Reynolds – background vocals, upright bass, bass guitar

Additional musicians

Robert Bailey – background vocals
Richard Bennett – requinto guitar
Dane Bryant – piano
Dennis Burnside – piano
Glenn Caruba – percussion
Mark Casstevens – acoustic guitar, gut string guitar, archtop guitar, banjo
Jeff Coffin – saxophone
Chris Dunn – trombone
Kim Fleming – background vocals
Dennis Good – trombone
Vicki Hampton – background vocals
"Father" David Hungate – upright bass
James House – acoustic guitar
Don Jackson – saxophone
Sam Levine – saxophone, flute
Jerry Dale McFadden – background vocals, Hammond B-3 organ, piano, Vox Jaguar, Wurlitzer
Farrell Morris – percussion, vibraphone
Dennis Solee – saxophone, flute, clarinet
George Tidwell – trumpet
Robby Turner – pedal steel guitar
Jim Williamson – trumpet

Strings performed by the Nashville String Machine. Strings and horns arranged by Dennis Burnside and Raul Malo. Conducted by Dennis Burnside.

Production
Produced by Raul Malo and Don Cook
Engineers: Mike Bradley, Mark Capps
Assistant engineers: Glenn Spinner, Aaron Swihart
Mixing: Mike Bradley
Mix assistants: Mark Capps, Aaron Swihart
Mastering: Hank Williams

Charts

Weekly charts

Year-end charts

References

1998 albums
The Mavericks albums
MCA Records albums
Albums produced by Don Cook